List of onions may refer to:

 List of Allium species; Allium is the onion genus, with 600-920 species, making it one of the largest plant genera in the world
 List of onion cultivars;  cultivars of the onion (Allium cepa)
 Onion varieties
 Onion (disambiguation)

See also

Onions